Darbast-e Yek (also Romanized as Dārbast-e Yek; also known as Dār Bast and Dārbast-e Bālā) is a village in Golestan Rural District, in the Central District of Sirjan County, Kerman Province, Iran. At the 2006 census, its population was 11, in 4 families.

References 

Populated places in Sirjan County